Mario Lashun Edwards Jr. (born January 25, 1994) is an American football defensive end for the Tennessee Titans of the National Football League (NFL). He played college football at Florida State and was drafted by the Oakland Raiders in the second round of the 2015 NFL Draft. He has also been a member of the New York Giants, New Orleans Saints and Chicago Bears.

Early years
Mario was raised in Denton, Texas, while his father played for the Dallas Cowboys. Edwards attended Prosper High School for his freshman and sophomore year, where he was a three-sport athlete in football, basketball and track. He started at defensive end for the state champion Eagles as a freshman. Edwards recorded 69 tackles and three sacks as a freshman on top of catching 17 passes for 361 yards and three touchdowns. He then transferred to Billy Ryan High School. As a junior, he recorded 127 tackles, 50 tackles for loss and 18 sacks leading Denton Ryan to a state runner-up finish against Austin Lake Travis led by Michael Brewer. As a senior in 2011, he recorded 72 tackles and 11 sacks and was the USA Today High School Defensive Player of the Year. Further, he earned All-American honors by USA Today, Parade, Sports Illustrated, and ESPN. In track & field, Edwards competed as a shot putter during his final two years at Denton, recording a top-throw of 15.08 meters (49 ft, 3 in) at the 2012 Richardson Invitational, where he placed first.

Regarded as a five-star recruit by Rivals.com, Edwards was ranked as the No. 1 defensive tackle prospect in his class. In fact, he was ranked No. 3 overall, which was Rivals.com’s highest ranking for a defensive tackle prospect since Haloti Ngata (No. 2) in 2002. According to ESPN recruiting analyst Craig Haubert, Edwards was similar to Da'Quan Bowers at the same stage of their careers. Recruited by numerous schools, Edwards took official visits to Texas, Oklahoma, Florida State, and Louisiana State, before committing to the Seminoles on January 24, 2012.

College career

In his true freshman year in Tallahassee, Edwards was initially projected to redshirt, but then forced into action due to the loss of Brandon Jenkins in week one. Edwards appeared in 11 games and made his first career start in the 2012 ACC Championship Game replacing Cornellius Carradine. For the season he had 17 tackles and 1.5 sacks. As a sophomore in 2013, Edwards recorded 34 tackles, 3.5 sacks and an interception. Returning as a starter his junior season in 2014, Edwards recorded 44 tackles and 3.0 sacks.

After his junior season, Edwards entered the 2015 NFL Draft.

Professional career

Oakland Raiders
Edwards was drafted by the Oakland Raiders in the second round (35th overall) of the 2015 NFL Draft.

On June 19, 2015, the Oakland Raiders signed Edwards to a four-year, $6.01 million contract with $3.72 million guaranteed and a signing bonus of $2.63 million. On December 23, 2015, Edwards was placed on injured reserve.

On September 5, 2016, Edwards was placed on injured reserve due to a hip injury. He was activated off injured reserve to the active roster on December 23, 2016.

On September 1, 2018, Edwards was waived by the Raiders.

New York Giants
On September 2, 2018, Edwards was claimed off waivers by the New York Giants.

New Orleans Saints
On March 15, 2019, Edwards signed a two-year, $5 million contract with the New Orleans Saints. He was released on September 5, 2020.

Chicago Bears
On September 8, 2020, Edwards was signed by the Chicago Bears. He played in 15 games recording 17 tackles and a career-high 4.0 sacks.

On January 15, 2021, Edwards was suspended by the NFL for the first two games of the 2021 season for violating the league's performance-enhancing drugs policy. He signed a three-year, $11.5 million contract extension with the Bears on March 16, 2021.

Edwards was released by the Bears on August 30, 2022.

Jacksonville Jaguars
On September 4, 2022, Edwards was signed to the Jacksonville Jaguars practice squad.

Tennessee Titans
On September 26, 2022, Edwards was signed by the Tennessee Titans off the Jaguars practice squad.

Personal life
Edwards was born while his father, Mario Edwards Sr., was still in high school. While the elder Edwards played college football at Florida State, the younger stayed in Mississippi with his grandmother, Ruth Chambers, and Mario Sr.'s sister and two brothers. After Edwards Sr. was drafted by the Dallas Cowboys in 2000, the family moved to the northern Dallas area.

References

External links
Chicago Bears bio
Florida State Seminoles bio

1994 births
Living people
People from Gautier, Mississippi
Players of American football from Mississippi
American football defensive ends
Chicago Bears players
Florida State Seminoles football players
Oakland Raiders players
New York Giants players
New Orleans Saints players
Jacksonville Jaguars players
Tennessee Titans players